Swarab Sahani (born 20 November 2002) is an Indian cricketer. He made his List A debut on 20 February 2021, for Tripura in the 2020–21 Vijay Hazare Trophy.

References

External links
 

2002 births
Living people
Indian cricketers
Tripura cricketers
Place of birth missing (living people)